Acadie—Bathurst (formerly Gloucester) is a federal electoral district in New Brunswick, Canada, that has been represented in the House of Commons of Canada since 1867.

Until 1997, the riding was largely held by the Liberal Party thanks to strong support from the francophone Acadian population.  There is also a notable Red Tory tendency in the riding that enabled the former Progressive Conservative Party to win on occasion. In the 1997 federal election, the New Democratic Party's  Yvon Godin won an unexpected victory over powerful Liberal cabinet minister Doug Young, mostly due to his Union connections and EI recipients' reaction to Liberal cuts to Employment Insurance.  Godin held the riding until his retirement as of the 2015 federal election, at which point the Liberals reclaimed the riding as part of their sweep of Atlantic Canada.

Geography
The district includes eastern Gloucester County, and the communities along Nepisiguit Bay. The neighbouring ridings are Miramichi (electoral district) and Gaspésie—Îles-de-la-Madeleine.

History
The electoral district was created at confederation in 1867, and was known as "Gloucester" until its name was changed in 1990.

In 2004, there were some legal problems regarding the 2003 boundaries. The following is from the Elections Canada website:

"In May 2004, the Federal Court of Canada made its decision in Raîche v. Canada (Attorney General), concerning a portion of the electoral boundary between the ridings of Miramichi and Acadie–Bathurst. The Court held that, in transferring certain parts of parishes from the riding of Acadie–Bathurst to Miramichi, the Federal Electoral Boundaries Commission for New Brunswick erred in its application of the rules governing the preparation of its recommendations. The new boundaries commission was created under Part I of the Inquiries Act in response to this court decision."

The current boundaries reverted to the ones used in the 1996 representation after the 2006 election. As per the 2012 federal electoral redistribution, this riding gained a small territory from what was part of Miramichi.

MP Yvon Godin's personal popularity ensured dominance throughout the riding for the NDP in the 2011 election. His long-time experience as a Union organizer possibly helped since he was otherwise not well known in Bathurst before the election, having moved in from the Acadian Peninsula where he was from. The Conservatives won just two polls in the Bathurst area and while the Liberals won most of the mobile polls, they won just one non-mobile poll, in Inkerman.

Members of Parliament

This riding has elected the following Members of Parliament:

Election results

Acadie—Bathurst

2021 general election

2019 general election

2015 general election

2011 general election

2008 general election

2006 general election

2004 general election

2000 general election

1997 general election

1993 general election

Gloucester, 1867–1993

Student Vote results

A Student Vote was conducted at participating Canadian schools to parallel Canadian federal election results. The vote was designed to educate students and simulate the electoral process for persons who have not yet reached the legal majority. Schools with a large student body that reside in another electoral district had the option to vote for candidates outside of the electoral district then where they were physically located.

2019 election

2015 election

2011 election

See also
 List of Canadian federal electoral districts
 Past Canadian electoral districts

References

Riding history for Gloucester from the Library of Parliament
Riding history for Acadie-Bathurst from the Library of Parliament
Campaign expenses from Elections Canada

Notes

Caraquet
Politics of Bathurst, New Brunswick
New Brunswick federal electoral districts